A love triangle is a romantic relationship involving three people.

Love triangle may also refer to:
The triangular theory of love, developed by psychologist Robert Sternberg to describe types of love 
"Love Triangle" (The Fairly OddParents), a television episode
Love Triangle (game show), a reality game show hosted by Wendy Williams
"Love Triangle" (song), a song by RaeLynn